The Croft is a large detached house on Totteridge Green in Totteridge, Barnet. It has been Grade II listed on the National Heritage List for England since November 1974.

The house was designed by the English architect T.E. Collcutt as his personal residence. It was subsequently profiled in an 1899 issue of The Builder. The formal gardens of The Croft originally contained a sculpture of Triton by Henry Pegram.

Collcutt also built another Grade II listed house on Totteridge Green, Fairspeir, and The Lynch House on Totteridge Common. Bridget Cherry, writing in the 1998 London: North edition of the Pevsner Architectural Guides, described The Croft as 'very picturesque' and 'a more relaxed version' of Richard Norman Shaw's 'Old English style'. The interior was described as having 'pretty plasterwork' and tiles by William De Morgan. The 1977 edition of the Pevsner guides had described the Croft's design as "three ranges and a court, roughcast, with Tudor windows" likening it to the domestic architecture of C. F. A. Voysey.

References

External links
Images of The Croft from  an 1898 issue of The Building News

Grade II listed houses in London
Grade II listed buildings in the London Borough of Barnet
Houses completed in 1898
Houses in the London Borough of Barnet
Thomas Edward Collcutt buildings
Totteridge